1,2-Dibromotetrafluoroethane (C2Br2F4) is a haloalkane. It is also known under codenames R-114B2 and Halon 2402. It is a colorless liquid with a boiling point of 47.2 °C. R-114B2 is occasionally used in fire suppression systems.  It is highly volatile, passes through soil to air, and can be detected in the parts-per-quadrillion range.

Since July 1, 1994, the Montreal Protocol required all nations or parties that are a party to it to eliminate the production, consumption, and trade of ozone-depleting substances (ODS). Dibromotetrafluoroethane's high ozone-depleting potential (ODP) caused it to be identified as an ODS. Dibromotetrafluoroethane has been prohibited in Canada since July 1, 1994, "except for essential uses or for use as analytical standards".

On November 8, 2008, an accident aboard Russian submarine K-152 Nerpa involving the unintentional activation of a fire suppressant system loaded with R-114B2 resulted in the death of 20 people.

Notes

Fire suppression agents
Organobromides
Organofluorides